The WPI Engineers college football team represents Worcester Polytechnic Institute (WPI) in the New England Women's and Men's Athletic Conference (NEWMAC). The Engineers compete as part of the NCAA Division III. The program has had 11 head coaches since it began play during the 1887 season. Since April 2010, Chris Robertson has served as head coach at WPI.

Key

Coaches

Notes

References

WPI

WPI Engineers football coaches